The Treaty of Pavia was signed in Pavia on October 9, 1617, between representatives of the Spanish Empire and the Duchy of Savoy. Based on the terms of the accord, Savoy returned the Duchy of Montferrat to the Duchy of Mantua. Moreover, the treaty managed to establish an unstable peace between the Duchy of Savoy and the Duchy of Milan.

See also
List of treaties

References

External links
Richelieu - Chapter IV
States and Crisis (1600-1660)

Pavia
1617 treaties
Pavia
Pavia